Matzbach may refer to:

Matzbach (Hollerbach), a river of Hesse, Germany, tributary of the Hollerbach
Matzbach (Geislbach), a river of Bavaria, Germany, tributary of the Geislbach